The Porta Maggiore ("Larger Gate"), or Porta Prenestina, is one of the eastern gates in the ancient but well-preserved 3rd-century Aurelian Walls of Rome. Through the gate ran two ancient roads: the Via Praenestina and the Via Labicana. The Via Prenestina was the eastern road to the ancient town of Praeneste (modern Palestrina). The Via Labicana (now called the Via Casilina) heads southeast from the city.

The gate

The Porta Maggiore is by far the best urban site to visit for an understanding and view of the ancient aqueducts.  It is a monumental double archway built of white travertine.  It was first known as the Porta Prenestina, perhaps a reference to the road over which it passes (the Via Praenestina).  The "gate," built in 52 AD by the emperor Claudius, was originally intended to provide a decorative section of support for two aqueducts, the Aqua Claudia and the Anio Novus.  At that time these aqueducts crossed the ancient Via Labicana and Praenestina roads thereby providing the opportunity to create at this location a sort of triumphal arch to the conquest of nature and its conqueror, the emperor Claudius. The two channels of these aqueducts, (the Aqua Claudia and Aqua Anio Novus), one lying on top of the other, can be seen when viewing the cross-section running through the travertine attic at the top of the gate.

The gate was incorporated in the Aurelian Wall in 271 AD by the emperor Aurelian thus truly turning it into an entrance (gate) to the city.  Experts refer to this as an early example of “architectural recycling,” essentially adapting one existing structure to another use, in this case using an aqueduct as a wall.

It was modified further when the emperor Honorius augmented the walls in 405. The foundations of a guardhouse added by Honorius are still visible, while the upper part of the gate, as built by Honorius, has been moved to the left side of the Porta.

It is currently known as the Porta Maggiore, possibly designated as such because of the road that runs through the gate leads to the Basilica di Santa Maria Maggiore. The church is an important place of prayer dedicated to the Virgin Mary.

The following inscriptions in praise of the emperors Claudius, Vespasian, and Titus for their work on the aqueducts are prominently displayed on the attic of the Porta Maggiore:

TI. CLAUDIUS DRUSI F. CAISAR AUGUSTUS GERMANICUS PONTIF. MAXIM., / TRIBUNICIA POTESTATE XII, COS. V, IMPERATOR XXVII, PATER PATRIAE, / AQUAS CLAUDIAM EX FONTIBUS, QUI VOCABANTUR CAERULEUS ET CURTIUS A MILLIARIO XXXXV, / ITEM ANIENEM NOVAM A MILLIARIO LXII SUA IMPENSA IN URBEM PERDUCENDAS CURAVIT.

([In AD 52] the Emperor Claudius [etc.] had the waters of the Claudia brought to Rome from the springs called Caeruleus and Curtius at the 45th milestone, and likewise the Anio Novus from the 62nd milestone, both at his own expense.)

IMP. CAESAR VESPASIANUS AUGUST. PONTIF. MAX. TRIB. POT. II IMP. VI COS. III DESIG. IIII P. P. / AQUAS CURTIAM ET CAERULEAM PERDUCTAS A DIVO CLAUDIO ET POSTEA INTERMISSAS DILAPSASQUE / PER ANNOS NOVEM SUA IMPENSA URBI RESTITUIT.

([In AD 71] the Emperor Vespasian [etc.] restored to the city at his own expense the Curtian and Caerulean waters, which had been led to the city by the deified Claudius but had fallen into intermittent use and disrepair for nine years.)

IMP. T. CAESAR DIVI F. VESPASIANUS AUGUSTUS PONTIFEX MAXIMUS TRIBUNIC. / POTESTATE X IMPERATOR XVII PATER PATRIAE CENSOR COS. VIII / AQUAS CURTIAM ET CAERULEAM PERDUCTAS A DIVO CLAUDIO ET POSTEA / A DIVO VESPASIANO PATRE SUO URBI RESTITUTAS CUM A CAPITE AQUARUM A SOLO VETUSTATE DILAPSAE ESSENT NOVA FORMA REDUCENDAS SUA IMPENSA CURAVIT.

([In AD 81] the Emperor Titus [etc.] at his own expense, had the Curtian and Caerulean waters, introduced by the deified Claudius and afterwards repaired for the city by Titus’s deified father Vespasian, restored with new structures, beginning from its source, after the aqueduct was ruined to its foundations from age.)

Nearby archaeological remains

Close by the gate, just outside the wall, is the unusual Tomb of the Baker, built by Marcus Virgilius Eurysaces.

In 1917, a subterranean Neopythagorean Porta Maggiore Basilica was discovered nearby on the Via Praenestina, dating from the 1st century. The groundplan shows three naves and an apse, a design similar to that which began to be adopted in Christian basilicas during the 4th century. The vaults are decorated with white stuccoes symbolizing Neopythagorean beliefs, although the precise meaning of elements of the decoration remains a subject of debate.

See also

Notes

References

External links 
 Information on the Porta Prenestina from the LacusCurtius website.
 Pictures of the gate
 Porta Maggiore information  
 Further information, and a map 
 High-resolution 360° Panoramas and Images of Porta Maggiore | Art Atlas
 

Buildings and structures completed in the 1st century
Maggiore

Rome R. XV Esquilino
Rome Q. VII Prenestino-Labicano